The 1932 Utah State Aggies football team was an American football team that represented Utah State Agricultural College in the Rocky Mountain Conference (RMC) during the 1932 college football season. In their 14th season under head coach Dick Romney, the Aggies compiled a 4–4 record (3–3 against RMC opponents), finished seventh in the conference, and outscored all opponents by a total of 123 to 105. The team won all four of its home games by a combined score of 110 to 12.

Schedule

References

Utah State
Utah State Aggies football seasons
Utah State Aggies football